Turini (Aymara turi tower, -ni a suffix, "the one with a tower", also spelled Torrini) is a mountain in the Bolivian Andes which reaches a height of approximately . It is located in the La Paz Department, Loayza Province, Cairoma Municipality, and in the Inquisivi Province, Quime Municipality. Turini lies northeast of Taruja Umaña and the lake named Warus Quta

References 

Mountains of La Paz Department (Bolivia)